Lucy Mitchell may refer to:

 Lucy Myers Wright Mitchell (1845–1888), American writer, historian, and expert on ancient art
 Lucy Miller Mitchell (1899–2002), early childhood education specialist and community activist
 Lucy Sprague Mitchell (1878–1967), American educator
 Lucy Mitchell (Grange Hill)